Vietnamophryne orlovi is a species of microhylid frog endemic to northern Vietnam. Its type locality is Phia Oac-Phia Den National Park, Cao Bang Province, northern Vietnam.

References

Vietnamophryne
Amphibians of Vietnam
Amphibians described in 2018